Amsa-dong is a dong (neighbourhood) of Gangdong-gu in Seoul, South Korea. The dong is well known for the Amsa-dong Prehistoric Settlement Site, in which Neolithic remains were excavated after a large amount of diagonal-line patterned earthenware was exposed by a flood in 1925.

See also 
Prehistory of Korea
Jeulmun Pottery Period
Dolmen
Administrative divisions of South Korea

References

External links
Gangdong-gu map at the Gangdong-gu official website
 The Amsa 1 & 4 dong Resident office

Neighbourhoods of Gangdong District
Archaeological sites in South Korea